Tarraby is a hamlet in the Carlisle district, in the county of Cumbria, England. Circa 1870, it had a population of 106 as recorded in the Imperial Gazetteer of England and Wales.

Location 
It is about two miles away from the city centre of Carlisle and is near the River Eden.

Transport 
For transport there is the B6264 about a quarter of a mile away, the A7 road, the A6 road, the A69 road, the A595 road, the A689 road and the M6 motorway nearby. There is also Carlisle railway station a few miles away, which is on the Settle-Carlisle Line.

Nearby settlements  
Nearby settlements include the city of Carlisle, the villages of Houghton, Rickerby, the hamlets of Whiteclosegate, Linstock, Brunstock and the residential areas (suburbs of Carlisle) of Knowefield, Stanwix, Edentown, Kingstown, Belah, Etterby and Moorville.

See also

Listed buildings in Stanwix Rural

References

External links
 Cumbria County History Trust: Stanwix (nb: provisional research only – see Talk page)

 http://www.british-towns.net/en/level_4_display.asp?GetL3=10635

Hamlets in Cumbria
City of Carlisle